Agapeta hamana is a moth of the family Tortricidae. It is found in Europe (from the Iberian Peninsula to the Ural Mountains), western and southern Siberia, the Caucasus, Kazakhstan, Transcaucasia, Asia Minor, Central Asia, Iran, Afghanistan, Mongolia, western China and northern India.

The wingspan is 15–25 mm. The pale yellow forewing has the costa moderately arched. The base of the costa, and a streak from the disc to beyond the middle of the tornus are ferruginous-fuscous. Sometimes there are several irregular variable ferruginous marks towards the margins. The hindwings are rather dark grey. Julius von Kennel provides a full description. 

The moth flies from June to August, from dusk.

The larvae feed on Carduus.

References

External links

Agapeta hamana at UKmoths
Lepiforum.de

Cochylini
Moths described in 1758
Tortricidae of Europe
Moths of Asia
Taxa named by Carl Linnaeus